Ora News is a regional and online television news channel based in Tirana, Albania. The news director is Miriam Ndroqi.

The Albanian Media Monitoring Board evaluated Ora News as the most balanced news presenter of the parliamentary elections in June 2009 and again in May 2011 for the local elections.

See also
Television in Albania

References

External links
 Official website
 "Ora News" programming from Top Channel TV

Television networks in Albania
Mass media in Tirana